Chung Yong-hwan (Hangul: 정용환, 10 February 1960 – 7 June 2015) was a South Korean football player and manager. Chung was a one-club man who spent all his professional career in K League side Daewoo Royals. He played for South Korea in 1986 and 1990 FIFA World Cup, and also captained in 1990. He died of stomach cancer on 7 June 2015.

Style of play 
Chung did not have great height, but he was noted for his jumping ability. He did not lose aerial duels against a 1.97 m forward Rob Landsbergen. His fast reaction and good sense of balance also made his defensive skills accurately. He didn't receive a yellow card for eight years from 1984 to 1991, even though he was a centre-back.

Career statistics

Club

International 

Results list South Korea's goal tally first.

Honours 
Korea University
Korean National Championship runner-up: 1981
Korean President's Cup: 1982

Daewoo Royals
K League 1: 1984, 1987, 1991
Korean National Championship: 1989
Korean League Cup runner-up: 1986
Asian Club Championship: 1985–86
Afro-Asian Club Championship: 1986

South Korea
Asian Games: 1986
AFC Asian Cup runner-up: 1988
Afro-Asian Cup of Nations: 1987
Dynasty Cup: 1990

Individual
K League 1 Best XI: 1984, 1987, 1991
Korean FA Best XI: 1984, 1985, 1987, 1988
AFC Asian Cup Team of the Tournament: 1988
Korean FA Player of the Year: 1988
K League 1 Most Valuable Player: 1991

References

External links
  
 Chung Yong-hwan – National Team Stats at KFA 
 
 
 Legends of K League: Chung Yong-hwan  

1960 births
2015 deaths
Association football defenders
South Korean footballers
South Korea international footballers
Busan IPark players
K League 1 players
K League 1 Most Valuable Player Award winners
1984 AFC Asian Cup players
1986 FIFA World Cup players
Footballers at the 1988 Summer Olympics
1988 AFC Asian Cup players
1990 FIFA World Cup players
Olympic footballers of South Korea
Korea University alumni
Asian Games medalists in football
Footballers at the 1986 Asian Games
Footballers at the 1990 Asian Games
Asian Games gold medalists for South Korea
Asian Games bronze medalists for South Korea
Medalists at the 1986 Asian Games
Medalists at the 1990 Asian Games
Sportspeople from Busan